Victor Alexandrovich Chizhikov (26 September 1935 – 20 July 2020) was a Russian children's book illustrator and the designer of the Olympic mascot, Misha, of the 1980 Moscow Olympic Games (the XXII Summer Olympics).

Chizhikov illustrated more than 100 children's books. He worked closely with writers Eduard Uspensky and Andrei Usachev.

Selected books
 Юбилейный альбом «Виктор Чижиков. Мои истории о художниках книги и о себе». Издательский Дом Мещерякова. (2015)
 333 Kота (2005)
 Доктор Айболит (2003)
 Петя и Потап (2002)
 Аля, Кляксич и буква `А` (2002)
 Площадь картонных часов (2001)
 Винни-Пух и все-все-все (2001)
 Было у бабушки сорок внучат (2001)
 Приключения Чиполлино. Сказка (2001)
 Забытый день рождения (2001)
 Вниз по волшебной реке (1979)
 Приключения волшебного лебедя (1978)

References

External links

Victor Chizhikov biography in Russian

1935 births
2020 deaths
Russian children's writers
Soviet children's writers
Soviet male writers
20th-century Russian male writers